Leobardo López Aretche (1942 in Mexico City – July 24, 1970) was a Mexican film director.

Biography 
He studied acting and directing with Seki Sano between 1959 and 1963. He then attended Centro Universitario de Estudios Cinematográficos (University Centre of Cinematographic Studies, CUEC) in UNAM,  where he directed six short films in four years. One of these (S.O.S / Catarsis, 1968) won a prize at a Canadian film festival. During the Mexican Student Movement of 1968, López and Carlos González Morantes were elected as representatives from CUEC-UNAM to the Consejo Nacional de Huelga (National Strike Council; in Spanish, CNH), the coordinating body behind the movement. He directed the documentary El grito, México 1968, one of the few cinematographic testimonies of the student movement that survived the censorship of the Mexican government. El grito was later selected as one of the 100 greatest Mexican films by Somos magazine.

In 1969, López Aretche shot the film La pasión and the following year, collaborated in the making of Alfredo Joskowicz's feature film Crates (1970). He committed suicide on 24 July 1970, while filming his debut feature El canto del ruiseñor. Jorge Ayala Blanco lamented his passing, saying that he was "an artist with a special vision". After his death, Alfredo Joskowicz made the film El cambio, based on a narrative by López Arretche.

Work

Short films 
 Lapso (1965)
 Panteón / No 45 (1966)
 El jinete del cubo (1966)
 S.O.S / Catársis (1968)
 El Hijo (1968)
 Leobardo Barrabás / Parto sin temor (1969)

Feature films 
 El grito, Mexico 1968 (1970)

As photographer 
 La pasión

As screenwriter 
 Crates (1970)

References 

Mexican film directors
20th-century Mexican male actors
Male actors from Mexico City
1942 births
1970 deaths
1970 suicides
Suicides in Mexico